The Free Ones is a Canadian documentary film, directed by Nicolas Lévesque and released in 2020. An expansion of his 2015 short film Interview with a Free Man (Entrevue avec un homme libre), which was named by the Toronto International Film Festival as one of the Canada's Top Ten short films in 2015, the film is a portrait of several ex-convicts who are readjusting to life as free men with jobs at a sawmill in Roberval, Quebec.

The film premiered at the 2020 Montreal International Documentary Festival.

The film received two Canadian Screen Award nominations at the 9th Canadian Screen Awards, for Best Cinematography in a Documentary (Jean-Philippe Archibald) and Best Editing in a Documentary (Natacha Dufaux).

References

External links
 

2020 films
2020 documentary films
Canadian documentary films
Canadian prison films
Quebec films
French-language Canadian films
2020s Canadian films